Tlatelolco, verano del 68 (Spanish for "Tlatelolco, summer of 68") is a 2013 Mexican film about the political events that took place in Mexico City in the months before the 1968 Olympics.

Plot
In the midst of protests of Mexico 68, two teenagers, Felix (Christian Vazquez) and Ana Maria (Cassandra Ciangherotti), from different social classes fall in love. The story begins with increasing repression of the student movement by the government of Gustavo Diaz Ordaz in the months prior to the Tlatelolco massacre of October 2, 1968. The relationship of Ana Maria and Felix takes place in the context of repression, forced disappearances, and an attempt to obscure the social protest.

References

External links
 

2010s Spanish-language films
2013 films
Mexican drama films
2010s political films
Films set in Mexico City
2010s Mexican films